Barnhill Tollhouse (also known as the Old Toll House), located just to the southeast of Perth, Scotland, was built in the early 19th century. Now a Category A listed building, it stands on Dundee Road, where it formerly collected tolls from vehicles entering the Perth city limits.

Its architect is believed to be Sir Robert Smirke, whose other designs include Perth Sheriff Court, the British Museum and Lancaster House.

It is a single-storey structure, in a T-plan with basement in the fall of the ground. Its ashlar front and centre bay projects recessed distyle Greek Doric columns. Its roof is slated and piended.

The building has been on the Buildings at Risk Register for Scotland since 2004. In 2018, plans were revealed to develop the structure into a three-storey dwelling with a rooftop garden. A plaque that showed the tolls due, which was on the right of the building's frontage, has been put into storage and will be restored to the structure upon the completion of work.

Gallery

See also
List of Category A listed buildings in Perth and Kinross
List of listed buildings in Perth, Scotland

References

External links
Perth, Dundee Road, Barnhill Tollhouse – Scotland's Places
A view of the building – Google Street View, November 2020

Category A listed buildings in Perth and Kinross
Buildings and structures completed in the 19th century
19th-century establishments in Scotland
Listed buildings in Perth, Scotland
Toll houses